The 1923 European Rowing Championships were rowing championships held on Lake Como in the Italian Lombardy region. The competition was for men only and they competed in five boat classes (M1x, M2x, M2+, M4+, M8+), the same ones as had been used at the 1920 Summer Olympics in Antwerp.

Medal summary

References

European Rowing Championships
European Rowing Championships
Rowing
Rowing
Rowing competitions in Italy
Como